A municipal election took place in Chile on October 26, 2008. The newly elected mayors and councilmen began their term on December 6, 2008.

Results

Mayoral election

Official and final results.

Councilmen election

Official and final results.

External links
  Electoral Service (Servel) - Final results (by candidate)
  Final results from the Ministry of Interior

References

2008 elections in Chile
Elections in Chile
October 2008 events in South America